Radia Client Automation software  is an end-user device (PC and mobile device) lifecycle management tool for automating routine client-management tasks such as operating system deployments and upgrades, patch management, application software deployment, application use monitoring, security, compliance, and remote system management.

In February 2013, Hewlett-Packard (HP) and Persistent Systems, Inc. agreed to an exclusive license for Persistent to access the HP Client Automation technology. Persistent is now developing the Radia Client Automation product line, based on the original HP Client Automation products. HP is also selling the Radia Client Automation products from Persistent.

History 
Radia Client Automation has been called various names in its life-cycle: HP OpenView Configuration Management software, Radia Enterprise Desktop Manager (EDM), and HP Client Automation Software.

 1992 - Novadigm launches Enterprise Desktop Manager (EDM)
 1997 - Novadigm launches Radia
 2004 - HP acquires Novadigm
 September 2004 - Version 4.0 Radia released
 April 2007 - Version 5.0 HP OpenView Configuration Management released
 October 2007 - Version 5.1 HP Configuration Management released
 July 2008 - Version 7.20 HP Client Automation released
 May 2009 - Version 7.50 HP Client Automation released
 Dec 2009 - Version 7.80 HP Client Automation released
 June 2010 – Version 7.90 HP Client Automation released
 Feb 2011 - Version 8.10 HP Client Automation released
 Jan 2013 - Version 9.00 HP Client Automation released
 Feb 2013 - Persistent Systems Ltd. enters into a strategic agreement with Hewlett-Packard (HP) to license its HP Client Automation (HPCA) software.
 June 2013 - Persistent Systems delivers on HPCA licensing agreement, launches Radia Client Automation at HP® Discover 2013

Key Features 
Radia Client Automation software can manage hundreds of thousands of client devices. It can be used to manage Microsoft Windows, Mac OS X and Linux desktops and laptops, mobile devices and tablets running iOS, Android and Windows 8 Series Mobile operating System, HP thin clients, and Windows and Linux servers.

Radia Client Automation uses a desired state management model where IT defines how it wants devices to look through a series of policies, while agents on client devices proactively synchronize and manage to that defined state. This model results in higher levels of compliance while at the same time significantly reducing the amount of effort needed to manage the environment.  It is especially effective for notebook or laptop PCs because infrequent and lower-bandwidth connections can limit the effectiveness of task-based models that are commonly found across the industry.

The major features in the 9.00 release are:
 Mobile device (iOS, Android and Windows) support
 Management over the Internet
 Windows 8 support
 End-to-end IPv6 support
 Patch management for Adobe and Java software
 Target-wise role-based access control

References

External links
 Radia Client Automation from Persistent Systems 
 What's New with HP Client Automation SlideShare presentation 

Client Automation Software